Lady Justice is a comic book published by Tekno Comix, starting in 1995. It was created by Neil Gaiman and the first three issues were written by Wendi Lee, with art by Greg Boone. The remaining issues of the first series were written by C. J. Henderson, with art by Michael Netzer/Steve Lieber in the first series and Fred Harper/Mike Harris in the second.

Publication history
The story was told over two series, lasting eleven and nine issues respectively, published in 1995 to 1996 and 1996 to 1997.

References

1995 comics debuts
American comics titles
Comics by Neil Gaiman